Qazilu (also Romanized as Qāẕīlū) is a village in Kaghazkonan-e Markazi Rural District, Kaghazkonan District, Meyaneh County, East Azerbaijan Province, Iran. At the 2006 census, its population was 98, in 28 families.

References 

Populated places in Meyaneh County